Jovante Moffatt (born December 25, 1996) is an American football safety for the Atlanta Falcons of the National Football League (NFL). He played college football at Middle Tennessee.

High school and college career
Moffatt's high school football team, the Union City Golden Tornadoes, won consecutive Class 1A Tennessee state championships during in his junior and senior seasons (2013 and 2014). In college, Moffatt was a member of the Middle Tennessee Blue Raiders for five seasons. He had 36 tackles with an interception, five passes broken and a forced fumble in his senior season before suffering shoulder injury and using a medical redshirt. As a redshirt senior, Moffat led the Blue Raiders with 98 tackles and three interceptions and was named honorable mention All-Conference USA. Moffatt finished his collegiate career with 313 tackles, 5.5 tackles for loss, 17 passes defended and five interceptions.

Professional career

Cleveland Browns
Moffatt was signed by the Cleveland Browns as an undrafted free agent following the 2020 NFL Draft on April 25, 2020. He was placed on the reserve/COVID-19 list by the team on July 26, 2020, and was activated nine days later. He was waived during final roster cuts on September 5, 2020, and was signed to the team's practice squad the next day. The Browns promoted Moffatt to their active roster on September 29, 2020. He was placed back on the COVID list on January 8, 2021, and activated the next day.

Moffatt was waived by the Browns on August 31, 2021. Moffatt was re-signed to the Browns' practice squad on September 1, 2021. The Browns elevated Moffatt to their active roster on October 9, 2021. He reverted to the Browns' practice squad on October 11, 2021. Moffatt was elevated to the active roster a second time on October 30, 2021; he reverted to the practice squad on November 1, 2021. Moffatt was elevated to the active roster again on December 11, 2021. Moffatt was elevated to the active roster once more as a COVID-19 replacement player on December 24, 2021.

New York Jets
On January 26, 2022, Moffatt signed a reserve/future contract with the New York Jets. He was waived on July 27, 2022.

Cleveland Browns (second stint)
On July 29, 2022, Moffatt was claimed off waivers by the Cleveland Browns. Moffatt was waived by the Browns on August 29, 2022.

Atlanta Falcons
On September 19, 2022, Moffatt was signed to the Atlanta Falcons practice squad. He was promoted to the active roster on November 8.

References

External links
Cleveland Browns bio
Middle Tennessee State Blue Raiders bio

1996 births
Living people
People from Union City, Tennessee
Players of American football from Tennessee
American football safeties
Middle Tennessee Blue Raiders football players
Cleveland Browns players
New York Jets players
Atlanta Falcons players